Kyle Nicholas Pacana Pascual (born April 13, 1990) is a Filipino professional basketball player for the Meralco Bolts of the Philippine Basketball Association (PBA).

College career

Pascual is one of the few players to win a championship in all his five years of playing in the NCAA for the San Beda College Red Lions.  He is the first NCAA player to notch the feat since Rommel Adducul, who was the star of the San Sebastian team that won five straight titles from 1993 to 1997.

Professional career
Pascual was drafted 24th overall by Kia in the 2014 PBA draft.

On March 20, 2016, Pascual was traded to the Blackwater Elite for Jason Ballesteros.

On September 10, 2017, Pascual, along with Riego Gamalinda, was traded to the Star Hotshots for Allein Maliksi and Chris Javier.

On November 25, 2021, Pascual, along with Justin Melton, was traded back to the Terrafirma Dyip (formerly Kia) for James Laput.

On May 26, 2022, Pascual, who became a free agent after declining Terrafirma's extension offer, signed a two-year deal with the Meralco Bolts.

PBA career statistics

As of the end of 2021 season

Season-by-season averages
 
|-
| align=left | 
| align=left | Kia
| 30 || 16.1 || .402 || .000 || .714 || 2.5 || .5 || .3 || .2 || 3.6
|-
| align=left rowspan=2| 
| align=left | Mahindra
| rowspan=2|26 || rowspan=2|22.4 || rowspan=2|.417 || rowspan=2|.375 || rowspan=2|.659 || rowspan=2|4.5 || rowspan=2|.3 || rowspan=2|.3 || rowspan=2|.4 || rowspan=2|6.9
|-
| align=left | Blackwater
|-
| align=left rowspan=2| 
| align=left | Blackwater
| rowspan=2|34 || rowspan=2|16.7 || rowspan=2|.471 || rowspan=2|.333 || rowspan=2|.615 || rowspan=2|3.2 || rowspan=2|.6 || rowspan=2|.3 || rowspan=2|.3 || rowspan=2|4.8
|-
| align=left | Star
|-
| align=left | 
| align=left | Magnolia
| 39 || 7.4 || .400 || .000 || .867 || 1.3 || .3 || .3 || .2 || 2.2
|-
| align=left | 
| align=left | Magnolia
| 30 || 7.5 || .408 || .200 || .583 || 1.2 || .4 || .1 || .4 || 1.6
|-
| align=left | 
| align=left | Magnolia
| 3 || 12.7 || .333 || — || — || 1.3 || .0 || .3 || .3 || 1.3
|-
| align=left rowspan=2| 
| align=left | Magnolia
| rowspan=2|24 || rowspan=2|9.3 || rowspan=2|.481 || rowspan=2|.200 || rowspan=2|.476 || rowspan=2|1.3 || rowspan=2|.3 || rowspan=2|.2 || rowspan=2|.0 || rowspan=2|2.6
|-
| align=left | Terrafirma
|-
|-class=sortbottom
| align=center colspan=2 | Career
| 186 || 12.9 || .429 || .240 || .644 || 2.3 || .4 || .2 || .3 || 3.5

References

1990 births
Living people
Blackwater Bossing players
Centers (basketball)
Filipino men's basketball players
Terrafirma Dyip players
Magnolia Hotshots players
San Beda Red Lions basketball players
Power forwards (basketball)
American men's basketball players
Terrafirma Dyip draft picks
American sportspeople of Filipino descent
Citizens of the Philippines through descent
Meralco Bolts players